Ashley Hansen (born 3 March 1983) is an Australian rules football coach and former player. He played for the West Coast Eagles in the Australian Football League (AFL), and has been an assistant coach in the AFL since 2013.

Playing career

West Coast Eagles
Hansen was born in Victoria, Australia and was educated at Mazenod College. His father, Clarke Hansen, was a respected sports commentator. Recruited from Northvale/Oakleigh Chargers, he made his debut for West Coast Eagles in round 11, 2004, against Collingwood, after being picked with selection 38 in the 2001 AFL Draft. Hansen was named the Eagles' rookie of the year for 2005.

Of the 14 games Hansen played during the 2006 season, the Eagles emerged victorious on every occasion. Hansen kicked two goals in the opening quarter of the 2006 AFL Grand Final, which the West Coast Eagles won by a solitary point.

In round 7, 2007, Hansen appeared in a losing side for the first time since the 2005 AFL Grand Final.

Hansen struggled with injuries during the latter half of his career, playing 14 games or less in each of his final four seasons, with only nine in 2009.  His name was often brought up during the trade period, however he remained with the Eagles, concluding his career as a one club player. Hansen was delisted at the end of the 2010 season, but continued playing at WAFL level with Swan Districts, where he had played reserves while a West Coast listed player. Hansen played with Swan Districts until 2012, and was part of its 2010 premiership team.

Coaching career

Western Bulldogs
Over nine years with the club, he served a variety of assistant coaching roles, including as coach of its reserves team in the Victorian Football League for three seasons, during which time he led the team to the 2016 premiership.

Carlton Football Club
In October 2021, Hansen signed as forwards assistant coach at  under senior coach Michael Voss for the 2022 season. In the 2022 season in Round 2, 2022, against the Western Bulldogs, Hansen filled in as caretaker interim senior coach in the absence of regular senior coach Michael Voss who tested positive for COVID-19. Carlton won the game by margin of twelve points under Hansen as stand-in senior coach for Voss.

Statistics

|- style="background-color: #EAEAEA"
! scope="row" style="text-align:center" | 2004
|style="text-align:center;"|
| 29 || 6 || 7 || 5 || 38 || 8 || 46 || 18 || 6 || 1.2 || 0.8 || 6.3 || 1.3 || 7.7 || 3.0 || 1.0
|-
! scope="row" style="text-align:center" | 2005
|style="text-align:center;"|
| 29 || 20 || 24 || 16 || 163 || 76 || 239 || 114 || 27 || 1.2 || 0.8 || 8.2 || 3.8 || 12.0 || 5.7 || 1.4
|- style="background:#eaeaea;"
! scope="row" style="text-align:center;" | 2006
|style="text-align:center;"|
| 29 || 14 || 17 || 17 || 124 || 37 || 161 || 101 || 14 || 1.2 || 1.2 || 8.9 || 2.6 || 11.5 || 7.2 || 1.0
|-
! scope="row" style="text-align:center" | 2007
|style="text-align:center;"|
| 29 || 14 || 22 || 17 || 107 || 70 || 177 || 97 || 19 || 1.6 || 1.2 || 7.6 || 5.0 || 12.6 || 6.9 || 1.4
|- style="background:#eaeaea;"
! scope="row" style="text-align:center" | 2008
|style="text-align:center;"|
| 29 || 13 || 11 || 12 || 109 || 48 || 157 || 82 || 20 || 0.8 || 0.9 || 8.4 || 3.7 || 12.1 || 6.3 || 1.5
|-
! scope="row" style="text-align:center" | 2009
|style="text-align:center;"|
| 29 || 9 || 12 || 9 || 71 || 28 || 99 || 43 || 13 || 1.3 || 1.0 || 7.9 || 3.1 || 11.0 || 4.8 || 1.4
|- style="background:#eaeaea;"
! scope="row" style="text-align:center" | 2010
|style="text-align:center;"|
| 29 || 2 || 2 || 3 || 22 || 2 || 24 || 13 || 3 || 1.0 || 1.5 || 11.0 || 1.0 || 12.0 || 6.5 || 1.5
|- class="sortbottom"
! colspan=3| Career
! 78
! 95
! 79
! 634
! 269
! 903
! 468
! 102
! 1.2
! 1.0
! 8.1
! 3.4
! 11.6
! 6.0
! 1.3
|}

References

External links

Ashley Hansen player profile page at WAFL FootyFacts

Australian people of Danish descent
West Coast Eagles players
West Coast Eagles Premiership players
Swan Districts Football Club players
1983 births
Living people
Australian rules footballers from Victoria (Australia)
Oakleigh Chargers players
Edith Cowan University alumni
One-time VFL/AFL Premiership players